Sevarin (also Romanized as Şevarīn; also known as Şūrī and Sūry) is a village in Chaharduli Rural District, Keshavarz District, Shahin Dezh County, West Azerbaijan Province, Iran. As of the 2006 census, its population was 657, in 146 families.

References 

Populated places in Shahin Dezh County